This list includes past footballers who have played for Ajax Cape Town F.C. from 11 January 1999 to 28 September 2020.

List of players

For the current squad, see Ajax Cape Town#Current squad.

Ajax Cape Town players on international cups

Notes
<div style="font-size: 90%;">

M.   Player who later managed the club.

1.  George Akpabio was playing for Vasco da Gama on loan for the 2012–2013 season, and Chippa United for the 2013–2014 season.

2.  Cole Alexander played for Vasco da Gama on loan for the 2010–2011 season, and Chippa United in 2012–13.

3.  Mario Booysen played for Bloemfontein Celtic on loan in 2009, Maritzburg United on loan for the 2009–2010 season, and SuperSport United on loan in 2011, leaving Ajax CT after his loan spell.

4.  Brent Carelse played for Ajax Cape Town from 2001 to 2007, and was loaned to Ajax Cape Town from SuperSport United in 2011.

5.  Nathan Gertse played for Ajax Cape Town starting in 2011, in the winter of 2012 he was loaned to Vasco da Gama for six months, and the loan was then extended for another year.

5.  Alcardo van Graan was loaned to Milano United in January 2013 on a six-month loan, where he is currently active.

6.  Aidan Jenniker played for Vasco da Gama on loan during the 2010–2011 season, before returning to Ajax CT where he still active.

7.  Stanton Lewis played for Ajax Cape Town from 2005 to 2006, and was loaned to Ajax Cape Town from Ajax Amsterdam for the 2009–2010 season, signing with Ajax CT who loaned him to Kaizer Chiefs in 2011.

8.  Cecil Lolo played for iKapa Sporting on loan for the 2009–2010 season, returning to Ajax Cape Town, where he is currently active, after his loan period.

9. Abia Nale played for Ajax Cape Town on loan from Kaizer Chiefs in 2013, where he is currently active.

10.  Robert Nauseb played for Bloemfontein Celtic on loan in 2004, before leaving Ajax Cape Town after his loan spell.

11.  Ashley Opperman played for Avendale Athletico on a loan from 2002 to 2003, before returning to Ajax CT for two more seasons.

12.  Robin Ngalande was loaned to Ajax Cape Town from Bidvest Wits in 2014, leaving Ajax Cape Town after his loan spell.

13.  Nathan Paulse was loaned to Ajax Cape Town from Hammarby IF in 2010, leaving Ajax Cape Town after his loan spell.

14.  Andre Petim was loaned to Golden Arrows for the 2012–2013 season, where he is currently on loan.

15.  Mfundo Shumana was loaned to Chippa United on loan during the 2012–13 season, returning to Ajax CT after his loan spell.

16.  Eleazar Rodgers was loaned to Ajax Cape Town from Mamelodi Sundowns in 2013, where he is currently active.

17.  Sici Shelembe is playing for Vasco da Gama on loan for the 2012–2013 season, where he is currently active.

18.  Diyo Sibisi played for Maritzburg United on loan during the 2010–2011 season, leaving Ajax CT after his loan spell.

19.  Seydouba Soumah played for iKapa Sporting on a loan from 2008 to 2009, and F.C. Cape Town from 2009 to 2010, before making his senior debut for Ajax CT the next year.

20. Corburn Woodington played for Ajax Cape Town and Supersport United 2005 to 2010.
Trialist for FCStrausburg in France and Ajax Amsterdam

References

 

Players
Cape Town-related lists